Stine Andersen Borgli (born 4 July 1990) is a Norwegian racing cyclist, who currently rides for UCI Women's WorldTeam . She rode in the women's road race event at the 2018 UCI Road World Championships.

Major results

2011
 3rd Road race, National Road Championships
2015
 5th Road race, National Road Championships
2016
 6th Road race, National Road Championships
2017
 6th Road race, National Road Championships
2018
 3rd Road race, National Road Championships
2019
 1st  Overall Vuelta a Burgos Feminas
 1st  Mountains classification Tour de Bretagne Féminin
 1st  Mountains classification Tour de Belle Isle en Terre-Kreiz Breizh Elites Dames
 3rd Overall Women's Tour of Scotland
 National Road Championships
4th Time trial
7th Road race
 5th Grand Prix de Plumelec-Morbihan Dames
 6th GP de Plouay – Bretagne
 10th Overall Grand Prix Elsy Jacobs
 10th Overall Belgium Tour
2020
 9th Road race, National Road Championships
 10th Overall Setmana Ciclista Valenciana
2021
 10th Dwars door Vlaanderen

References

External links
 
 
 
 
 
 

1990 births
Living people
Norwegian female cyclists
People from Sandnes
Olympic cyclists of Norway
Cyclists at the 2020 Summer Olympics
Sportspeople from Rogaland